Hodgson v National and Local Government Officers' Association [1972] 1 WLR 130 is a UK labour law case, concerning the governance of trade unions in the United Kingdom.

Facts
NALGO’s 1971 conference decided it opposed EEC entry unless it can be shown to be in Britain and the Community’s interests. But then the National Executive Committee of the union directed NALGO delegates to support a motion at the TUC annual conference for joining, or oppose motions against joining. Members of the Leeds branch sought an injunction because under the union constitution the conference ‘directed’ the ‘general policy’.

Judgment
Goulding J upheld the application. He noted it was not within an exception to Foss v Harbottle. But then he said that...

See also

UK labour law

Notes

References

United Kingdom labour case law